In organic chemistry, a nucleophilic addition reaction is an addition reaction where a chemical compound with an electrophilic double or triple bond reacts with a nucleophile, such that the double or triple bond is broken. Nucleophilic additions differ from electrophilic additions in that the former reactions involve the group to which atoms are added accepting electron pairs, whereas the latter reactions involve the group donating electron pairs.

Addition to carbon–heteroatom double bonds 
Nucleophilic addition reactions of nucleophiles with electrophilic double or triple bond (π bonds) create a new carbon center with two additional single, or σ, bonds. Addition of a nucleophile to carbon–heteroatom double or triple bonds such as >C=O or -C≡N show great variety. These types of bonds are polar (have a large difference in electronegativity between the two atoms); consequently, their carbon atoms carries a partial positive charge. This makes the molecule an electrophile, and the carbon atom the electrophilic center; this atom is the primary target for the nucleophile. Chemists have developed a geometric system to describe the approach of the nucleophile to the electrophilic center, using two angles, the Bürgi–Dunitz and the Flippin–Lodge angles after scientists that first studied and described them.

This type of reaction is also called a 1,2-nucleophilic addition. The stereochemistry of this type of nucleophilic attack is not an issue, when both alkyl substituents are dissimilar and there are not any other controlling issues such as chelation with a Lewis acid, the reaction product is a racemate. Addition reactions of this type are numerous. When the addition reaction is accompanied by an elimination the reaction type is nucleophilic acyl substitution or an addition-elimination reaction.

Addition to carbonyl groups
With a carbonyl compound as an electrophile, the nucleophile can be:
 water in hydration to a geminal diol (hydrate)
 an alcohol in acetalisation to an acetal
 a hydride in reduction to an alcohol
 an amine with formaldehyde and a carbonyl compound in the Mannich reaction
 an enolate ion in an aldol reaction or Baylis–Hillman reaction
 an organometallic nucleophile in the Grignard reaction or the related Barbier reaction or a Reformatskii reaction
 ylides such as a Wittig reagent or the Corey–Chaykovsky reagent  or α-silyl carbanions in the Peterson olefination
 a phosphonate carbanion in the Horner–Wadsworth–Emmons reaction
 a pyridine zwitterion in the Hammick reaction
 an acetylide in alkynylation reactions.
 a cyanide ion in cyanohydrin reactions

In many nucleophilic reactions, addition to the carbonyl group is very important. In some cases, the C=O double bond is reduced to a C-O single bond when the nucleophile bonds with carbon. For example, in the cyanohydrin reaction a cyanide ion forms a C-C bond by breaking the carbonyl's double bond to form a cyanohydrin.

Addition to nitriles
With nitrile electrophiles, nucleophilic addition take place by:
 hydrolysis of a nitrile to form an amide or a carboxylic acid
 organozinc nucleophiles in the Blaise reaction
 alcohols in the Pinner reaction.
 the (same) nitrile α-carbon in the Thorpe reaction. The intramolecular version is called the Thorpe–Ziegler reaction.
 Grignard reagents to form imines. The route affords ketones following hydrolysis or primary amines following imine reduction.

Addition to carbon–carbon double bonds 
The driving force for the addition to alkenes is the formation of a nucleophile X− that forms a covalent bond with an electron-poor unsaturated system -C=C- (step 1). The negative charge on X is transferred to the carbon – carbon bond.

In step 2 the negatively charged carbanion combines with (Y) that is electron-poor to form the second covalent bond. Ordinary alkenes are not susceptible to a nucleophilic attack (apolar bond). Styrene reacts in toluene with sodium to 1,3-diphenylpropane  through the intermediate carbanion:

Another exception to the rule is found in the Varrentrapp reaction. Fullerenes have unusual double bond reactivity and additions such as the Bingel reaction are more frequent. When X is a carbonyl group like C=O or COOR or a cyanide group (CN), the reaction type is a conjugate addition reaction. The substituent X helps to stabilize the negative charge on the carbon atom by its inductive effect. In addition when Y-Z is an active hydrogen compound the reaction is known as a Michael reaction. Perfluorinated alkenes (alkenes that have all hydrogens replaced by fluorine) are highly prone to nucleophilic addition, for example by fluoride ion from caesium fluoride or silver(I) fluoride to give a perfluoroalkyl anion.

References 

Reaction mechanisms